The 2008–09 Gozo First Division, also known as the ONVOL First Division due to sponsorship reasons, was the 61st season of the Gozitan First Division, which saw Sannat Lions declared champions for the first time in 19 years. The league started on 17 September 2008 with a match between Sannat Lions and SK Victoria Wanderers where the Victoria-based side won 3–0, with Ige Adesina being the first scorer of the season.

Promotion and relegation 

Promoted: S.K. Victoria Wanderers
Relegated: Xagħra United

League table

Results

Matches 1–12 

Teams play each other twice, once assigned as home and once away.

Matches 13–18

Relegation play-off 

A play-off match took place between the sixth-placed team in this division, Kerċem Ajax, and the second-placed team from the Second Division, Xagħra United, for a place in the 2009–10 GFL First Division.

Gozo First Division seasons
5
Malta